Cliniodes latipennis is a moth in the family Crambidae. It was described by Eugene G. Munroe in 1964. It is found in southern Brazil, north to Minas Gerais.

References

Moths described in 1964
Eurrhypini